Dragan Kovačević may refer to:

 Dragan Kovačević (basketball player), Yugoslavia national basketball team player from Serbia
 Dragan Kovačević (politician born 1969), SDP of Croatia & Croatian People's Party politician; Zagreb City Assembly member, see Elections in the Social Democratic Party of Croatia
 Dragan Kovačević (politician born 1968), Croatian Democratic Union politician and member of parliament, see Members of the 6th Sabor
Dragan Kovačević (football coach), for C.D. Águila

See also
 Dragana Kovačević, a Serbian cyclist